Persondy (the Priest's House), Mamhilad, Monmouthshire is a former parsonage dating from the late 16th century. It is a Grade II* listed building. The adjacent barn, now a separate residence called Ysguborwen, has its own Grade II listing.

History and description
The house dates from the late 16th century and is constructed to a two-cell plan. It was built as the parsonage to the parish Church of St Illtyd. It is largely unaltered since its construction, with the exception of the addition of a veranda to the south and east sides in the 1940s. It is built of Old red sandstone which has been white rendered, an alteration which the architectural historian John Newman, writing in his Gwent/Monmouthshire Pevsner, considers "unattractiv[e]". Aside from its unaltered state, the notable feature of Persondy is its "extraordinarily rich" interior joinery, which Newman describes as a "joy in oaken carpentry". David Barnes, in his Companion Guide to Wales, calls the interior "a remarkable survival", and Peter Smith notes the unexpectedly "fine work [to be] found in [this] small, two-unit, house".

The adjacent barn was converted to residential use in 1993 and has its own Grade II listing. Coflein considers that the barn may originally have functioned as a tithe barn to the parsonage, following a suggestion first made by Sir Cyril Fox and Lord Raglan in Sub-Medieval Houses, c. 1550–1610, the second volume of their multi-volume study, Monmouthshire Houses.

Notes

References

Sources

External links
 Coflein Record with interior images

Grade II* listed buildings in Monmouthshire
Country houses in Wales
Grade II* listed houses in Wales